The 1999 Oceanian Futsal Championship (OFC) was the third edition of the main international futsal tournament of the Oceanian region. It took place from August 21 to August 28, 1999, and was hosted by Port Vila, Vanuatu.

The tournament also acted as a qualifying tournament for the 2000 FIFA Futsal World Championship in Guatemala. The Australia won the tournament, and qualified for the World Cup.

Group stage

Group

All time at UTC+11

Champion

References

External links
 Oceanian Futsal Championship su RSSSF.com

1999
1999 in futsal
Futsal
International futsal competitions hosted by Vanuatu
1999 in Vanuatuan sport